The 1996 UTEP Miners football team was an American football team that represented the University of Texas at El Paso in the Western Athletic Conference during the 1996 NCAA Division I-A football season. In their fourth year under head coach Charlie Bailey, the team compiled a 2–9 record.

Schedule

References

UTEP
UTEP Miners football seasons
UTEP Miners football